Caden Shields (born 7 August 1988) is a New Zealand long-distance runner. In 2019, he competed in the men's marathon at the 2019 World Athletics Championships held in Doha, Qatar. He finished in 30th place.

References

External links 
 

Living people
1988 births
Place of birth missing (living people)
New Zealand male long-distance runners
New Zealand male marathon runners
World Athletics Championships athletes for New Zealand